Watsonia can refer to:

 Watsonia (gastropod), a genus of sea snails in the family Caecidae
 Watsonia (plant), a genus of flowering plants in the iris family
 Watsonia (journal), now the New Journal of Botany
 Watsonia, Victoria, a suburb of Melbourne, Australia

Genus disambiguation pages